KKBO (105.9 FM, "The Big Rig") is a country music radio station in Bismarck, North Dakota (licensed to Flasher). It serves the Bismarck-Mandan metropolitan area. The station broadcasts from a storefront studio on North 4th Street in Bismarck (along with sister station KXRV) competing against iHeartMedia's KQDY/94.5, KBMR/1130, and Townsquare Media's KUSB "US 103.3".

History
The station was launched by Connoisseur Media, LLC on December 19, 2008. KKBO was sold to Larry Schmidt's Radio Bismarck-Mandan in September 2012. The purchase was consummated on October 1, 2012 at a price of $700,000. On December 9, 2012 KKBO changed their format from adult hits (as "Bob FM") to country, branded as "105.9 The Big Rig - New Country and The Legends".

References

External links
Official "Big Rig 105.9" website

KBO
Country radio stations in the United States